KMHK (103.7 FM) is a commercial radio station in Billings, Montana. KMHK recently switched to a classic rock music format branded as “The New 103.7 The Hawk”. Licensed to Billings, Montana, United States, the station serves the Billings area. The station is currently owned by Townsquare License, LLC.

Ownership
In October 2007, a deal was reached for KBBB to be acquired by GAP Broadcasting II LLC (Samuel Weller, president) from Clear Channel Communications as part of a 57 station deal with a total reported sale price of $74.78 million. What eventually became GapWest Broadcasting was folded into Townsquare Media on August 13, 2010.

References

External links

MHK
Classic rock radio stations in the United States
Radio stations established in 1987
1987 establishments in Montana
Townsquare Media radio stations